Gealtacht Mael Mórdha is the second full-length studio album by Irish celtic doom metal band Mael Mórdha.

Track listing

 "Atlas of Sorrow" – 10:37
 "Godless Commune of Sodom" – 6:01
 "A Window of Madness" – 5:50
 "Curse of the Bard" – 4:47
 "The Struggle Eternal" – 7:22
 "Gealtacht Mael Mórdha" – 5:23
 "Minions of Manannan" – 4:32

Personnel

Roibéard Ó Bogail – Vocals, piano, whistle
Gerry Clince – Guitars
Anthony Lindsay – Guitars
Dave Murphy – Bass
Shane Cahill – Drums

External links
Gealtacht Mael Mórdha @ Encyclopaedia Metallum
Gealtacht Mael Mórdha @ metalstorm.ee

2007 albums
Mael Mórdha albums